Calla High School is an Alternative high school. Located in Manteca, California. It used to be labeled as a continuation school due to its past of accepting expelled students, now Calla High School only accepts valid students of Manteca Unified School District, in the hope of receiving accelerated credits to get students back on track.

High schools in San Joaquin County, California
Public high schools in California
Manteca, California